Disrupted in renal carcinoma 2 is a protein that in humans is encoded by the DIRC2 gene.

Function 

This gene encodes a membrane-bound protein from the major facilitator superfamily of transporters. Disruption of this gene by translocation has been associated with haplo-insufficiency and renal cell carcinomas.

References

Further reading